Uncial 0257 (in the Gregory-Aland numbering), is a Greek uncial manuscript of the New Testament. Paleographically it has been assigned to the 9th century.

Description 

The codex contains some parts of the Matthew 5-26; Mark 6-16, on 47 parchment leaves (29.5 cm by 22 cm). It is written in two columns per page, 23 lines per page, in uncial letters. It is a palimpsest, the upper text contains a lectionary 2094. 

Currently it is dated by the INTF to the 9th century.

Contents 

 Matt 5:17-29; 8:4-19; 12:4-13:41; 13:55-14:15; 25:28-16:19; 21:20-43; 22:13-24:24; 25:6-36; 26:24-39; 
 Mark 6:22-36; 7:15-37; 8:33-11:22; 14:21-16:12.

Text 
The Greek text of this codex is a representative of the Byzantine text-type. Aland placed it in Category V.

Location 
Currently the codex is housed at the Monastery of Agiou Nikanoros (2, ff. 1-16, 289-319) in Zavorda.

See also 

 List of New Testament uncials
 Textual criticism

References 

Greek New Testament uncials
Palimpsests
9th-century biblical manuscripts